Kaarina Goldberg (born January 28, 1956) is a Finnish author and journalist who lives in Vienna. She is best known for her children's books Petokylän Ilona Ilves, Rämäpäinen robotti and her comic strip Senni ja Safira in the Finnish newspaper Eläkeläiset. She is also a columnist for the Finnish gastronomy magazine Teema Nova.

In August 2010, her Senni ja Safira-comic strips were released as a book by the Finnish publishing house Karisto, representing the first comic-related publication in the company's history so far.

Family life

Kaarina Goldberg lives with her husband in Austria since 1985. They have two sons (born 1984 and 1988).
She is the aunt of the Finnish politicians Irina Krohn and Minerva Krohn.

Books

References 

1956 births
Finnish women writers
Finnish journalists
Living people
Finnish expatriates in Austria
Finnish women journalists